Francisco Assis dos Santos or simply Nen  (born 3 August 1978), is a Brazilian central defender. He currently plays for Atlético Mineiro.

Honours

Gama
Brazilian Série B: 1998
Federal District Championship: 1999, 2000, 2001, 2003

Palmeiras
São Paulo State Championship: 2008

External links
 CBF
 sambafoot
 Guardian Stats Centre

1978 births
Living people
Brazilian footballers
Association football defenders
Sociedade Esportiva do Gama players
Sociedade Esportiva Palmeiras players
Clube Atlético Mineiro players
Esporte Clube Bahia players
Sportspeople from Federal District (Brazil)